Chiloglanis anoterus, the pennant-tailed suckermouth, is a species of upside-down catfish native to Mozambique, South Africa and Eswatini where it occurs in escarpment streams of the Pongolo and Incomati River systems.  This species grows to a length of  SL.

References

External links 

anoterus
Freshwater fish of Africa
Fish of Mozambique
Fish of South Africa
Fish of Eswatini
Taxa named by Robert S. Crass
Fish described in 1960